The Larry Sandler Memorial Award is a prestigious international award given for research in the Drosophila community.  The award is given for the best dissertation of the preceding year, and is given at the annual Drosophila Research Conference.  Awardees may be nominated only by their graduate advisors.

The awardees give the Larry Sandler Memorial Lecture at the annual Drosophila Research Conference.  The award honors Dr. Larry Sandler.

Award recipients
 1988 Bruce Edgar
 1989 Kate Harding
 1990 Michael Dickinson
 1991 Maurice Kernan
 1992 Doug Kellogg
 1993 David Schneider
 1994 Kendal Broadie
 1995 David Begun
 1996 Chaoyong Ma
 1997 Abby Dernburg
 1998 Nir Hacohen
 1999 Terence Murphy
 2000 Bin Chen
 2001 James Wilhelm
 2002 Matthew C. Gibson
 2003 Sinisa Urban
 2004 Sean McGuire
 2005 Elissa Hallem
 2006 Daniel Ortiz-Barrientos
 2007 Yu-Chiun Wang
 2008 Adam A. L. Friedman
 2009 Timothy T. Weil
 2010 Leonardo B. Koerich
 2011 Daniel Babcock
 2012 Stephanie Turner Chen
 2013 Weizhe Hong
 2014 Ruei-Jiun Hung
 2015 Zhao Zhang
 2016 Alejandra Figueroa-Clarevega
 2017 Danny E. Miller
 2018 Lucy Liu
 2019 Laura Seeholzer
 2020 Balint Kacsoh
 2021 Ching-Ho Chang
 2022 Lianna Wat
 2023 James O'Connor

Former chairs of the Award
 1988 Chair: Barry Ganetzky
 1989 Chair: Barry Ganetzky
 1990 Chair: Barry Ganetzky
 1991 Chair:
 1992 Chair:
 1993 Chair:
 1994 Chair:
 1995 Chair:
 1996 Chair: Margaret Fuller ("Minx" Fuller)
 1997 Chair: Larry Goldstein
 1998 Chair: R. Scott Hawley
 1999 Chair: Bill Sullivan
 2000 Chair: Bill Saxton
 2001 Chair: Lynn Cooley
 2002 Chair: Steve DiNardo
 2003 Chair: Amanda Simcox ("Mandy Simcox")
 2004 Chair: Ross Cagan
 2005 Chair: Gerold Schübiger
 2006 Chair: R. Scott Hawley
 2007 Chair: Helen Salz
 2008 Chair: Mariana Wolfner
 2009 Chair: John Carlson
 2010 Chair: Robin Wharton
 2011 Chair: Claude Desplan
 2012 Chair: Richard Mann
 2013 Chair: Kenneth Irvine
 2014 Chair: Marc Freeman
 2015 Chair: Erika Bach
 2016 Chair: Daniela Drummond-Barbosa
 2017 Chair: Bob Duronio
 2018 Chair: Kim McCall
 2019 Chair: Daniel Barbash
 2020 Chair: Barbara Mellone
 2021 Chair: Guy Tanentzapf
 2022 Chair: Alissa Armstrong
 2023 Chair: Tim Mosca

See also

 List of biology awards

References

Biology awards
Awards established in 1988
Early career awards
Awards for scholarly publications